Portrait-Robot or The Sketch Artist is a French Canadian ten-part television crime drama series, which premiered on Club Illico on April 15, 2021. It was broadcast on Australian network, SBS-TV's streaming service, On Demand, from December 16, 2021. The series was co-created by Sophie Lorain (who also acts) with her spouse, Alexis Durand-Brault (who also directs). The action is set in Montreal, where the titular identikit or forensic sketch artist, Éve Garance (Rachel Graton), profiles both suspects and victims for a police investigation unit. The unit's leader, Maryse Ferron (Lorain) is assisted by veteran detective, Bernard Dupin (Rémy Girard) and rookie crime scene technician, Anthony Kamal (Adrien Bélugou). Major story arcs are generally resolved in two episodes, while background stories continue across more episodes. According to Club Illico's press release, in October 2021, Portrait-Robot, has been renewed for a second season.

Premise 

Éve, a forensic identikit artist, who profiles suspects and victims for a Montreal police unit led by Maryse. Lead detective Bernard also mentors rookie, Anthony as they analyze crime scenes and question witnesses. Éve submerges herself in people's recollections to create her images. A subtext is the disappearance of Éve's infant son, William five years ago, coupled with her bipolar condition and the recent return of her ex-husband James. Meanwhile, Canadian Intelligence hired Bernard to infiltrate the local mafia, which are planning to expand operations. Maryse's brittle bone disease is worsening and her pregnant daughter, Delphine is worried by its inheritability.

Cast 

 Rachel Graton as Éve Garance: Montreal forensic sketch artist, diagnosed with bipolar II disorder, which is regulated by medication, her son William disappeared five years ago
 Sophie Lorain as Maryse Ferron: Investigation Unit's leader, wheel-chair bound with brittle bone disease-like condition
 Rémy Girard as Bernard Dupin: career police officer, unit's lead investigator
 Adrien Bélugou as Anthony "Anto" Kamal ( Ramadés Kamal): recent unit member, crime scene technician, back-up detective
 Brett Donahue as James Healy: Éve's ex-husband, father of William, billionaire businessman who now lives in England, engaged to Laura
 Kathleen Fortin as Elektra Stavros-Poulain: Cyber Crimes investigator, Bernard's casual sex friend.
 Gio Lione as Santo Luciani: Mafia 2nd-in-charge, Bernard's waterfront contact
 Antoine Rivard-Nolin as Xavier Desjardins: uniformed police officer, first-on-scene at William's disappearance, also arrested "Jon-E-Zee"
 Teddy Pluviose as Evans Toussaint: Internal Affairs investigator
 Jean-François Pichette as Patrick Lacenaire: former cyber-security expert and computer programmer, convicted serial killer, born-again Christian
 Martine Francke as Rita Young: Franco-Ontarian widow, Adèle's mother
 Romane Denis as Audrey Sandôme: now 20-year-old pregnant woman, former 12-year-old kidnap, rape victim
 Hubert Proulx as Karl Maublanc: Audrey's father-in-law
 Roch Aubert as Nick Chauvet: retired policeman, suspected pedophile
 Émile Schneider as "Jon-E-Zee"/Jonathan Dareau: YouTuber, fakes his own assault for clickbait
 Irlande Côté as Romane Lever: 10-year-old kidnap victim, rescued by police
 Michel Brouillette as Dr. Pascal Lauzon: gynecologist
 Alex Bisping as Mr Rosenberg: Patrick's lawyer
 Marie Turgeon as Annie Chevalier: former paramedic, later a writer, vlogger
 Rémi Goulet as Gabriel Falco: Patrick's cyber security intern, committed suicide
 Simon Boudreault as Julien Falco: Gabriel's father
 Nazmiye Moutier as Vicky Lacerda: 16-year-old prostitute for Joker, mutilated murder victim
 Lydia Dépeault as Lilou Lacerda: Vicki's 18-year-old sister, fellow prostitute for Joker
 Carla Turcotte as Delphine: Maryse's daughter
 Jean-René Moissan as Philippe Daviau: Belcastel High School counsellor, procures students for Joker's prostitution ring
 Fabrice Yvanoff Sénat as Jean-Christophe Bonnessée or "Joker": local pimp, who brands his prostitutes with Jo/<3® tattoo, 3-5-5 criminal gang leader
 Isabelle Giroux as "Mother of Vicky Lacerda": drug-addled, disinterested mother of Lilou and Vicky
 Camille Felton as Adèle: Rita's daughter, runaway aged 16, joined a cult, Brotherhood of the Dusk
 Robert Lalonde as Michel Lambeau/Robert Hargrave: Robert assumes Michel's identity as an expert on cults and  sacred geometry, as Robert he survived when his family completed a cult ritual killing youngsters
 Gaston Lepage as Christophe Marivaux or "Kriss Rambo": sells survival kits and supplies to doomsday preppers and cultists
 Karim Babin as Ziad Nardnashir: towtruck driver, partner of Erika (third shooting victim)
 Anyjeanne Savaria as Cléa Millet: 22-year-old double-homicide victim, shot alongside her boyfriend
 Jules Roy Sicotte as Théo Rivière: 22-year-old double-homicide victim, shot alongside his girlfriend
 Rodger LaRue as Jocelyn Demarais: Ziad's legally blind neighbor
 Antoine Yared as David Brown: James' friend, attended their home on night William disappeared
 Laurent Bélanger as Benjamin Trevor: Cléa's ex-boyfriend, threatened Théo

Episode guide

References 

2021 Canadian television series debuts
2020s Canadian crime drama television series
French-language television shows
Television shows set in Montreal
Club Illico original programming